The name Anarawd may refer to:

Anarawd ap Rhodri (died 916), King of Gwynedd
Anarawd ap Gruffydd (died 1143), prince of Deheubarth  in south-west Wales